Salomon Tandeng Muna (27 March 1912 – January 22, 2002) was a Cameroonian politician of the Cameroonian National Union. He served as the first Prime Minister of the federated state of West Cameroon from January 11, 1968 to June 2, 1972. Additionally, he served as Vice President of the Federal Republic of Cameroon from 1970 to 1972. He was President of the National Assembly of Cameroon from 1973 to 1988.

Muna was very active in international scouting, where he became the Vice-President of the World Scout Committee (the first African member), after serving as Chief Scout of Cameroon, as well as Chairman of the African Scout Committee.

Muna was awarded the Bronze Wolf, the only distinction of the World Organization of the Scout Movement, awarded by the World Scout Committee for exceptional services to world Scouting, in 1981.

References

External links

1912 births
2002 deaths
People from Northwest Region (Cameroon)
Prime Ministers of Cameroon
Vice presidents of Cameroon
Presidents of the National Assembly (Cameroon)
Recipients of the Bronze Wolf Award
Scouting and Guiding in Cameroon
Kamerun National Congress politicians
20th-century Cameroonian politicians